Antonio Segura "Toni" Robaina (born 30 November 1974) is a Spanish retired footballer who played as a midfielder.

Club career
Robaina was born in Las Palmas. After starting out with local UD Las Palmas, playing mainly in Segunda División B, the 20-year-old signed with CD Tenerife also in the Canary Islands in 1995, immediately having an impact in La Liga by playing 39 games as the club finished fifth and qualified to the UEFA Cup, also appearing regularly as his team reached the latter competition's semi-finals.

After another average season he gradually fell out of favour with Tenerife and, in the 1999 January transfer window, returned to Las Palmas in the first of a series of loans. Robaina spent one season in Portugal with Sporting Clube de Portugal, taking no part whatsoever in the Lisbon side's national championship conquest (three games, ten minutes). In the following year he played with another team in his native region, Universidad de Las Palmas CF, suffering relegation from Segunda División and being subsequently released by his main club, for which he appeared in nearly 150 competitive games.

From the age of 27 until his retirement eight years later, Robaina played almost exclusively in the third level of Spanish football, with one-year spells in Tercera División and in regional football, with the majority of the sides hailing from the Canary Islands.

Personal life
Robaina's son, also named Antonio, is also a footballer and a midfielder.

Honours

Club
Sporting
Primeira Liga: 1999–2000

Country
Spain U16
UEFA European Under-16 Championship: 1991

Spain U17
FIFA U-17 World Cup: Runner-up 1991

References

External links

1974 births
Living people
Footballers from Las Palmas
Spanish footballers
Association football midfielders
La Liga players
Segunda División players
Segunda División B players
Tercera División players
UD Las Palmas players
CD Tenerife players
Universidad de Las Palmas CF footballers
AD Ceuta footballers
CD Guijuelo footballers
Primeira Liga players
Sporting CP footballers
Spain youth international footballers
Spain under-21 international footballers
Spain under-23 international footballers
Spanish expatriate footballers
Expatriate footballers in Portugal